Joan Cross (7 September 1900 – 12 December 1993) was an English soprano, closely associated with the operas of Benjamin Britten. She also sang in the Italian and German operatic repertoires. She later became a musical administrator, taking on the direction of the Sadler's Wells Opera Company.

Career
Cross was born in London. She attended St Paul's Girls' School, where her music teacher was the composer Gustav Holst, and studied singing at the Trinity College of Music. In 1923, she joined the chorus of the Vic-Wells opera company at the Old Vic, later taking on a wide range of solo soprano roles for the Sadler's Wells company and a few at the Royal Opera House, Covent Garden. Her Covent Garden performances included Mimi in La Bohème and Desdemona (to Lauritz Melchior's Otello) in 1934.

During this period she also became a noted Marschallin, Sieglinde and Brünnhilde, Elisabeth, Elsa, Madame Butterfly, Aida, Donna Anna and Tatiana.

Cross undertook the direction of Sadler's Wells Opera Company in the Second World War. Sadler's Wells had been forced to convert to a touring company because its theatre was requisitioned by the government for war-related purposes. The theatre reopened on 7 June 1945 with the première of Britten's Peter Grimes, in which work Cross created the leading female role of Ellen Orford.

The other Britten roles that she created were:

Female Chorus in The Rape of Lucretia (Glyndebourne 1946);
Lady Billows in Albert Herring (Glyndebourne 1947);
Elizabeth I in Gloriana (Covent Garden 1953); and
Mrs Grose in The Turn of the Screw (La Fenice, Venice 1954).

In the series of Decca recordings of his operas Britten conducted, Cross appeared only in the 1955 mono recording of The Turn of the Screw, the other operas being recorded after her retirement from singing—namely Peter Grimes in 1958, Albert Herring in 1964 and The Rape of Lucretia in 1970. (Gloriana was not commercially recorded until 1992, when Cross was aged 92.) However, archival recordings of her performances as Ellen Orford and the Female Chorus became available in the 1990s.

Because of rifts within the Sadler's Wells Company, Cross left to become a founding member of the English Opera Group in 1946–7. She sang comparatively little in the post-war years and retired from singing in 1955.

Cross began directing opera in 1946, beginning with Der Rosenkavalier at Covent Garden and, in 1950, she staged La traviata for Sadler's Wells. In addition to directing in London she also worked abroad, primarily in the Netherlands and with the Norwegian National Opera.

She founded the Opera School (later the National School of Opera, then London Opera Centre) with Anne Wood in 1948.

Joan Cross died in Aldeburgh on 12 December 1993. She is buried in Saint Peter and Saint Paul's churchyard, Aldeburgh, where her associates Britten, Peter Pears and Imogen Holst are also interred.

As well as her Britten recordings, Cross made 78-rpm discs of a number of operatic arias and other pieces of music during the 1930s and '40s. They attest not only to the beauty of her good-sized lyric voice but also to the high quality of her technique and the intelligence of her interpretations.

Sources
D. Brook, Singers of Today (Revised Edition – Rockliff, London 1958), 55–60.

1900 births
1993 deaths
People educated at St Paul's Girls' School
Honorary Members of the Royal Philharmonic Society
English operatic sopranos
Benjamin Britten
Singers from London
20th-century British women opera singers
British arts administrators
Women arts administrators